Van Nuys station is an Amtrak and Metrolink train station in the Van Nuys neighborhood of Los Angeles, California. Amtrak's Pacific Surfliner from San Luis Obispo to San Diego, Amtrak's Coast Starlight from Los Angeles to Seattle, Washington, and Metrolink's Ventura County Line from Los Angeles Union Station to East Ventura stop here.

 Amtrak's Coast Starlight serves the station with one train daily in each direction.

The station when opened the first time in 1982 was called Panorama City, and was served by the short-lived CalTrain service in 1982–83. In 1988, service was restored with the Amtrak San Diegan with the station renamed as Van Nuys, and Metrolink service began in 1992.

History 

The diagonal railway across the San Fernando Valley was built in 1904 as a cutoff for the Southern Pacific Coast Line. At the time the main Van Nuys station was located further south on the Burbank branch, at the modern Van Nuys G Line station.

Panorama City station opened with the inauguration of CalTrain on October 18, 1982. The short-lived service ended on March 1, 1983. Amtrak service to Van Nuys (the former CalTrain station) began on June 26, 1988, when one San Diegan round trip was extended to Santa Barbara. Metrolink began Ventura County Line service with a stop at Van Nuys on October 26, 1992. A modern glass-and-concrete Van Nuys station building, funded by Caltrans, opened on December 18, 1995.

The station originally had a single side platform serving the southern track of the two-track Ventura Subdivision. (A third track to the north is part of the Union Pacific Railroad Gemco Yard. In January 2018, Metrolink began construction of an island platform — which serves both main tracks — and a pedestrian underpass. Original plans called for a second side platform instead, but the island platform design had fewer impacts. The project was originally to be completed in late 2019, but was not officially finished until January 2020.

Future 

Van Nuys is expected to be expanded in the coming years to provide more connectivity through the Valley and the rest of Los Angeles County.

The Los Angeles County Metropolitan Transportation Authority East San Fernando Light Rail Transit Project line runs adjacent to the station and the agency is planning a stop near Keswick Street to provide an interchange between systems. A new island platform in the median of Van Nuys Boulevard is expected to open for service in 2028. That line's maintenance and storage facility is additionally planned to be located nearby.

This is the northernmost station of the further planned Sepulveda Pass Transit Corridor.  new subway or aerial platforms are planned to be built at Van Nuys for the service.

References

External links 

 Van Nuys, CA – USA Rail Guide (TrainWeb)

Amtrak stations in Los Angeles County, California
Metrolink stations in Los Angeles County, California
Public transportation in the San Fernando Valley
Van Nuys, Los Angeles
Railway stations in the United States opened in 1982
Railway stations closed in 1983
Railway stations in the United States opened in 1988
Future Los Angeles Metro Rail stations
1982 establishments in California
1983 disestablishments in California
1988 establishments in California